Colus azygosorius is a species of sea snail, a marine gastropod mollusk in the family Colidae, the true whelks and the like.

References

 Tiba R. (1980) Descriptions of a new species of the genus Colus and two new species of the genus Plicifusus (Buccinidae, Gastropoda). Bulletin of the Institute of Malacology, Tokyo 1(5): 74-76, pls 21-23.

External links

Colidae
Gastropods described in 1980